The Specially Designated Nationals and Blocked Persons List, also known as the SDN List, is a United States government sanctions/embargo measure targeting U.S.-designated terrorists, officials and beneficiaries of certain authoritarian regimes, and international criminals (e.g. drug traffickers). The list is managed by the U.S. Treasury’s Office of Foreign Assets Control (OFAC). When individuals are added to the list of Specially Designated Nationals (SDN), their U.S. assets are blocked. Moreover, their names are added to automated screening systems used by banks in the United States and many foreign countries, making it difficult for them to open or hold accounts, transfer monies, or transact property internationally.

The SDN list contains tens of thousands of companies, organizations, and individuals who have been identified as posing a threat to U.S. national security and foreign and economic policy. All persons and businesses within the U.S. are prohibited from doing business with blacklisted individuals or are subject to sanctions for violating the law. Financial sanctions include a ban on investment in the stock of the blacklisted individuals and companies in which the blacklisted individuals have a controlling interest, and a ban on new debt (including all securities such as bonds, credits, bills of exchange, etc.) with a maturity of more than 90 days. After the Crimean crisis, the US blacklisted a number of Russian and Crimean companies for sanctions. Almost every country is represented on the list.

Notable sanctioned persons

People's Republic of China

Hong Kong SAR
 Carrie Lam – Former Chief Executive of Hong Kong
 Chris Tang – Secretary for Security
 Teresa Cheng – Secretary for Justice of Hong Kong
 John Lee –  Chief Executive of Hong Kong

Mainland China
 Chen Quanguo – Chinese Communist Party 19th Politburo member
 Wang Chen – Chinese Communist Party 19th Politburo member
 Zhang Xiaoming – Former Deputy director of the State Council's Hong Kong and Macao Affairs Office
 You Quan – Former Head of CCP's United Front Work Department

Belarus
 Alexander Lukashenko – President of the Republic of Belarus
 Mikalai Karpiankou – Deputy Minister of Internal Affairs 
 Natallia Eismant – Press secretary of Alexander Lukashenko
 Viktor Khrenin – Minister of Defense

Russia
 Vladimir Putin – President of the Russian Federation.
 Petr Fradkov – Russian economist and banker serving as the chairman and CEO of Promsvyazbank and the general director of the Russian Export Center.
 Valery Gerasimov – current Chief of the General Staff of the Armed Forces of the Russian Federation.
 Sergei Ivanov – Russian senior official and politician who has served as the Special Representative of the President of the Russian Federation on the Issues of Environmental Activities, Ecology and Transport since 12 August 2016.
 Vladimir Kiriyenko – Chairman and CEO of VK (formerly known as Mail.ru Group)
 Sergei Lavrov – Russian diplomat and politician who has served as the Foreign Minister of Russia since 2004.
 Nikolai Patrushev – Russian politician, security officer and intelligence officer. He served as Director of the Russian Federal Security Service (FSB), from 1999 to 2008, and he has been Secretary of the Security Council of Russia since 2008.
 Igor Sechin – Russian oligarch and a government official, considered a close ally and "de facto deputy" of Vladimir Putin.
 Sergei Shoigu – General of the Army who serves as Minister of Defence of the Russian Federation and as Chairman of the Council of Ministers of Defense of the CIS since 2012.

Other
 Bashar al Assad – President of Syrian Arab Republic
 Asma al Assad – First Lady of Syria
 Nicolás Maduro – President of Venezuela
 Tareck El Aissami – Minister of Petroleum (Venezuela)
 Marinko Čavara – President of the Federation of Bosnia and Herzegovina
 Wan Kuok-koi – Former leader of the Macau gang 14K 
 Mohammad Javad Zarif – Former foreign minister of Iran
 Esmail Qaani – Commander of the Quds Force of Iran's Islamic Revolutionary Guard Corps
 Ebrahim Raisi – President of Iran
 Ayatollah Ali Khamenei – Supreme Leader of Iran
Sašo Mijalkov – Former Administration for Security and Counterintelligence of Republic of North Macedonia
Nikola Gruevski – Former Prime Minister of the Republic of North Macedonia
Svetozar Marović – Former President of Serbia and Montenegro

Former (deceased) 
 Slobodan Milošević – (until 2006) Former President of Serbia/Yugoslavia
 Anwar al-Awlaki (until 2011) – American-born al-Qaeda leader, killed by drone strike in Yemen
 Bi Sidi Souleymane – (until 2021) Former leader of the Central African Republic-based militia group Return, Reclamation, Rehabilitation
 Saddam Hussein – (until 2006) Former President of Iraq
 Qasem Soleimani – (until 2020) Former Commander of the Quds Force of Iran's Islamic Revolutionary Guard Corps
 Muammar Gaddafi – (until 2011) Former leader of Libya

Notes

References

External links
SDN List Search

 
American legal terminology
United States foreign policy